Mr. O'Malley was a character in the comic strip  Barnaby, by cartoonist Crockett Johnson.  He was the fairy godfather of five-year-old Barnaby.

Jackeen J. O'Malley first appeared in response to Barnaby's wish for a fairy godmother. His magic wand was the stub of his half-smoked Havana cigar.

Mr. O'Malley's conceit was matched only by his inability to grant the simplest childhood request, and his misguided attempts never failed to get Barnaby into hot water.

Mr. O'Malley was a comic strip original, though in appearance he had a passing resemblance to W.C. Fields. "Cushlamochree" (from the Irish "cuisle mo chroí", "beat of my heart") was his signature cry when shocked by the inevitable down-turn of events in response to his ineffectual meddling in Barnaby's affairs. Throughout the course of his comic career Mr. O'Malley stumbled his way into the U.S. Congress and became a Wall Street tycoon.

Other Media
A stage play entitled "Barnaby and Mr. O'Malley" using most of the comic strip characters was created in 1946 with Thomas Wm. Hamilton (4897 Tomhamilton) and J. M. Kerrigan in the title roles. A 1950s television show ran briefly with Ronald Reagan in one role.  Many of the original comic strips were republished in three volumes of paperback books.

References

Barnaby (comic strip)
Fictional fairies and sprites
Comics characters who use magic